Daniele Daino (born 8 September 1979) is an Italian former professional footballer who played as a defender.

He played for AC Milan, Napoli, Perugia, Ancona and Bologna in Italy,

In 2001, he was signed on loan by English side Derby County, facing competition from Benfica and Alavés but made only two league appearances in the first two matches of the season.

He was successively signed by Modena in November 2008 as a free agent, after his contract with Bologna expired. He left Modena in June 2009, and joined newly promoted Gallipoli at the end of August.

References

External links
Player profile at aic.football.it/
Player profile at ioBologna.net
 Daniele Daino's National Team Stats at FIGC.it

1979 births
Living people
Italian footballers
Italy under-21 international footballers
Italy youth international footballers
A.C. Milan players
S.S.C. Napoli players
A.C. Perugia Calcio players
Derby County F.C. players
A.C. Ancona players
Bologna F.C. 1909 players
Modena F.C. players
A.S.D. Gallipoli Football 1909 players
U.S. Alessandria Calcio 1912 players
Serie A players
Serie B players
Premier League players
Expatriate footballers in England
Italian expatriate sportspeople in England
Italian expatriate footballers
Association football defenders